is a fictional character introduced as one of the main protagonists in The Legend of Zelda: Twilight Princess, a 2006 video game in Nintendo's The Legend of Zelda series. She is a member of the magic-wielding Twili who joins forces with Link to prevent the kingdom of Hyrule from being enveloped by a corrupted parallel dimension known as the Twilight Realm. While Midna appears as an imp-like creature in the majority of Twilight Princess, her actual form is humanoid. She was designed by Yusuke Nakano and voiced by Akiko Kōmoto. Midna's first appearance was in a trailer for Twilight Princess shown at the 2005 Electronic Entertainment Expo (E3); at the time, her gender was unknown, leaving some journalists confused about it.

Midna was generally well received by critics and fans alike. Her role in Twilight Princess has been compared to that of Navi, who accompanies Link in the 1998 game Ocarina of Time. Midna makes minor appearances in Super Smash Bros. Brawl, Super Smash Bros. for Nintendo 3DS and Wii U, and Super Smash Bros. Ultimate, and is a playable character in Hyrule Warriors.

Concept and design
The concept of Midna came from another game Nintendo was working on before Twilight Princess, which was eventually abandoned. Eventually re-purposed for Twilight Princess, Midna was illustrated by Yusuke Nakano and voiced by Akiko Kōmoto. In describing the character, The Legend of Zelda: Twilight Princess director Eiji Aonuma called her "tsundere", which means a character who starts the story as snobbish and brash, but becomes gentler and kinder over time, a character archetype both he and Shigeru Miyamoto, co-creator of The Legend of Zelda series, are fond of. When asked by Game Informer editor Billy Berghammer if Midna would make a follow-up appearance to her role in Twilight Princess, Aonuma found it unlikely that she would return due to the game's ending, but added that if there were enough demand, the developers may consider it.

Midna's original form is a turquoise-skinned woman with body markings on her limbs, orange hair, and red eyes. As stated in The Legend of Zelda: Hyrule Historia, her design has an "air of the Middle East" as opposed to Princess Zelda's Westernized design. She wears a South Asian-like attire composing of black gagra choli with a trailing black veil. However, after being cursed by Zant, Midna became a diminutive "imp". Other than her lack of clothing, save a fragment of the Fused Shadow relic as a mask, Midna bears elements of her original form. While in her imp form, Midna frequently speaks in sinister and sarcastic ways, often acting uninterested in Link's plight unless they suit her needs. Her bright orange hair is her main method of physical control while she is in imp form and often uses it to deal physical damage or control Link while he is in his wolf form. Her on-screen dialogue is often accompanied by a babble of pseudo-speech, which was produced by scrambling English phrases sampled by Kōmoto.

Appearances

Video games 
Midna's game of origin, Twilight Princess, reveals her backstory as being the next in line to rule the Twilight Realm, making her the eponymous "Twilight Princess". However, the power-obsessed Twili Zant usurps the throne from Midna using powers granted to him by Ganon to turn their people into monsters. Stripped of her power and turned into a diminutive imp-like creature, a vengeful Midna finds a fragment of the Fused Shadow prior to witnessing Link's capture and transformation into a wolf by Zant's Shadow Beasts. Seeing use in him, Midna rescues Link and convinces him to help her find the other Fused Shadow fragments to regain her birthright. Over time, Midna becomes less insensitive and sassy toward Link. After obtaining the last Fused Shadow, Zant catches the two of them off-guard and seizes the Fused Shadows, exposes Midna to the Light Spirit Lanayru and makes her fall ill; and curses Link to remain in wolf form, causing him to seek the Master Sword to reverse this. Princess Zelda heals Midna, causing herself to disappear. After obtaining the Master Sword, Link and Midna begin their search for the Twilight Mirror. Upon discovery of the mirror, they find that Zant has broken it and scattered its pieces. After the mirror's restoration, Midna and Link travel to the Twilight Realm and defeat Zant. The two of them travel to Hyrule Castle to defeat Ganondorf, the source of Zant's power.  After defeating Ganon's Bestial form, Midna uses the power of the Fused Shadows to attempt to finish off Ganondorf, but is found to have been unsuccessful when Ganondorf approaches Link, crushing the fragment of the Fused Shadow that Midna wore on her face as a mask. After Ganondorf is defeated and Hyrule Castle is destroyed, Midna is restored to her original humanoid form. She returns to the Twilight Realm and shatters the Mirror of Twilight, separating the Light and Twilight Realms and preventing a potential repeat of Zant's actions by someone else.

In Hyrule Warriors, Midna is attacked by the sorceress Cia during her battle with Zant's forces and is banished from the Twilight Realm when Cia allies with Zant. While antagonistic at first, Midna allies herself with Lana and Agitha to help Link and Zelda defeat Cia and restore order, and later to defeat the revived Ganondorf. She is also playable in her true Twili form as part of the Twilight Princess DLC pack. In Hyrule Warriors Legends, a mysterious crystal briefly restores Midna to her true form. She uses her restored power to aid Princess Zelda with help from Linkle, but she is forced to destroy the crystal and returns to her imp form.

Midna makes minor appearances in Super Smash Bros. Brawl in the form of collectible stickers and trophies. A song from Twilight Princess, "Midna's Lament", is featured as a song in Brawl as well. She also appears in Super Smash Bros. for Nintendo 3DS and Wii U and Super Smash Bros. Ultimate as an assist trophy.

Manga 
Midna appears in a long-running manga based on The Legend of Zelda: Twilight Princess. The series ran from 2016–2022 and was written and illustrated by Japanese artist duo Akira Himekawa. The manga provides additional details to the storyline of Twilight Princess, including information about Midna's backstory, and further develops the relationship between her and Link.

Amiibo 
For The Legend of Zelda: Twilight Princess HD on the Wii U, Nintendo released the Wolf Link amiibo, which features Midna riding on the back of Link in his wolf form.

Reception
Midna was first revealed in the E3 2005 trailer of Twilight Princess, which also first showed the Twilight Realm and Wolf Link. Her gender was unknown at the time, causing some confusion among journalists. IGN editor Matt Casamassina commented that the "colorful character" clashed with the then-black and white world of the Twilight Realm, though he was excited to see how the wolf-and-rider mechanics would work.

Midna has received mostly positive reception from both the video game press and the public for her role in Twilight Princess. Game Informer editor Andrew Reiner stated that she, along with Link's wolf transformation, had incredible effects on Twilight Princess gameplay. Fellow Game Informer editor Billy Berghammer said that he loved Midna, describing her as a cool character due to how she messed with Link throughout the game. 1UP.com editor Jeremy Parish wrote that the supporting characters of Twilight Princess make up for Link's laconic nature, Midna more so than others. He described her as being acerbic and thoughtful, as well as an intricate character who moves the plot forward for her own means. While America's Intelligence Wire editor Dave Arey described her as intriguing, he felt that she could have been more so if Nintendo had developed her further. GamesRadar listed her as one of the 25 best new characters of the decade, stating that before Midna, the only characters they could relate to were Link, Princess Zelda, and Ganon. RPGamer editor Matthew Rickert opined that he found nothing intriguing or likable about her, complaining about how much more plot time she receives in spite of this, arguing that she offers little help to Link and that it felt like she had replaced Zelda in Twilight Princess. Yahtzee Croshaw of Zero Punctuation claimed that she stood out from previous support characters in the series with "an interesting arc".

She has also been praised for her overall role in the series and as a Nintendo character. She ranked at fifth place on the top ten best female video game characters by members of Official Nintendo Magazines forum. The ONM staff added that she was well loved by Nintendo fans, and her back story made it difficult to dislike her. G4TV editor Michael Leffler called her a wonderful addition to the series, adding that she balances Link out. Nintendo Power, in discussing the ending to Twilight Princess, describes the relationship between Link and Midna as one of the most compelling in The Legend of Zelda history. IGN editor Lucas M. Thomas refers to her as essentially the second playable character in Twilight Princess.

Midna has been compared to several characters, most often to fellow The Legend of Zelda series character Navi. Nintendo World Report editor Jonathan Metts compared Midna to Navi as well, calling them analogues to each other but differed in saying that he did not find her annoying in the least. He added that unlike Navi, she had an actual personality and an ambiguous sense of morality. A preview of Twilight Princess in magazine GameAxis Unwired also compared Midna to Navi, though criticizing her inability to identify enemies' names and weaknesses like Navi could. Shacknews editor David Craddock compared Midna to The Legend of Zelda: Majora's Mask partner Tatl, a character physically similar to Navi, calling her "very sarcastic" and "very amusing". Because of this, he found her to be much more interesting than Navi. In the book The Meaning of Video Games: Gaming and Textual Studies, author Steven Edward Jones discusses multiple non-playable characters that assist the playable character throughout the game, including Midna. He compared Midna to another wolf-riding assistant named Issun from the action game Ōkami, adding that they both seem to be based on Navi. He went further to suggest that these kinds of characters could be based on Tinker Bell from Peter Pan.

Before the release of Super Smash Bros. Brawl, Midna's inclusion as a playable character was a popular suggestion amongst fans. In an article detailing the top ten most-wanted characters for Brawl, IGN editors Phil Pirrello and Richard George ranked Midna third, citing her controlling personality and shadow-based powers, which they say would add some much-needed unconventional gameplay to the Super Smash Bros. series. Midna was also featured in two of IGN's Smash It Up editorials; first as the Reader's Choice and later amongst other dual characters. Both of these were written by Lucas M. Thomas, who also praised the character for her potential as a quality Super Smash Bros. fighter. In response to their top ten most-wanted characters list, a group of Midna fans began sending many emails to IGN, causing members of the IGN Stars staff to create an article mentioning their forum as well as their cause to have Midna appear in more video games.

Notes

References

External links
 

Female characters in video games
Fictional characters from parallel universes
Fictional characters who can manipulate darkness or shadows
Fictional monsters
Nintendo protagonists
Princess characters in video games
Shapeshifter characters in video games
The Legend of Zelda characters
Woman soldier and warrior characters in video games
Video game characters introduced in 2006
Video game characters who can teleport
Video game characters who use magic
Video game sidekicks